Francis Arthur Cockfield, Baron Cockfield, PC (surname pronounced "Co-feeld"; 28 September 1916 – 8 January 2007), was by turns a civil servant, a company director, a Conservative Party politician, and a European Commissioner. He served as Minister of State at the Treasury from 1979 to 1982, as Secretary of State for Trade from 1982 until 1983, as Chancellor of the Duchy of Lancaster from 1983 until 1984, and a member of the European Commission from 1984 to 1988. He is known as 'The Father of the Single Market'.

Early life
Cockfield was born in Horsham, West Sussex, a month after his father, Lieutenant C. F. Cockfield, died at the Battle of the Somme. He was educated at Dover Grammar School, then read for an LLB and a BSc (Econ) at the London School of Economics.

Career
Cockfield joined the Inland Revenue in 1938, and was called to the bar at the Inner Temple in 1942. He progressed rapidly within the Inland Revenue, serving as Director of Statistics from 1945 to 1952 and as a Commissioner from 1951 to 1952, before joining retailer Boots as its finance director. He was its managing director and chairman from 1961 to 1967. He was also a member of Selwyn Lloyd's National Economic Development Council from 1962 to 1964.

Cockfield was known by his first name, Frank, for most of his life but hated it. When he married his first wife, Ruth Simonis, his granddaughter, Emma, recalls how he told her he wished to use his middle name instead: "All my life I've been called Frank but I've hated it – you're to call me Arthur."

Cockfield left Boots to become an adviser to the Conservative politician Iain Macleod on taxation and economic matters, and was president of the Royal Statistical Society from 1968 to 1969. Macleod died shortly after the Conservatives took power in 1970, but Cockfield went on to advise Anthony Barber, Macleod's successor as Chancellor of the Exchequer, until 1973. He then served as chairman of the Price Commission from 1973 to 1977, receiving a knighthood in 1973 New Years Honours List.

Political career
Cockfield was created Baron Cockfield, of Dover in the County of Kent on 14 April 1978. On the election of Margaret Thatcher to office in May 1979, he became a Minister of State at the Treasury, a post he held until April 1982. He became a member of the Privy Council in 1982, and was the last Secretary of State for Trade from 1982, before it was merged with the Department of Industry in 1983.

After the 1983 general election, Cockfield became Chancellor of the Duchy of Lancaster. In this role he had no specific departmental responsibilities, so he effectively became an advisor and a sort of one-man think-tank to the Prime Minister. Lord Cockfield resigned from the cabinet in September 1984 to join the European Commission as commissioner for Internal Market, Tax Law and Customs under Jacques Delors, and a vice-president of the first Delors Commission. He was expected to follow Thatcher's eurosceptic line, but became a driving force in laying the groundwork for the creation of the Single European Market in 1992. Only a few months after he arrived in Brussels, he produced a mammoth white paper listing 300 barriers to trade, with a timetable for them to be abolished. He was not selected to serve a second term, and was replaced by Leon Brittan.

Later career 
After leaving the Commission in 1988, Cockfield became a consultant for accountants Peat, Marwick, McLintock. He was awarded the Grand Cross of the Order of Leopold II of Belgium in 1990, and honorary doctorates and fellowships from a number of British and American universities.

Personal life
He married twice. He married his first wife, Ruth Helen Simonis, in 1943, but they divorced in the early 1960s. They had a daughter and a son. He later married choreographer Monica Mudie, in 1970; she died in 1992.

Lord Cockfield is buried, along with his wife Monica, on the Isle of Man.

Arms

References

External links
 Obituary, The Times, 10 January 2007
 Obituary, The Guardian, 11 January 2007
 Obituary, The Daily Telegraph, 11 January 2007
 Obituary, The Independent, 22 January 2007

|-

|-

|-

|-

1916 births
2007 deaths
Alumni of the London School of Economics
Chancellors of the Duchy of Lancaster
Civil servants in the Board of Inland Revenue
Conservative Party (UK) life peers
British European Commissioners
British Secretaries of State
Knights Bachelor
Members of the Privy Council of the United Kingdom
Recipients of the Grand Cross of the Order of Leopold II
People from Dover, Kent
People from Horsham
Presidents of the Royal Statistical Society
People educated at Dover Grammar School for Boys
Presidents of the Board of Trade
European Commissioners 1985–1988
Life peers created by Elizabeth II